The following is a list of teams that have made appearances in the National Collegiate Women's Ice Hockey Championship listed by their conference. The championship has existed since the 2000–2001 season and groups include the university teams of Divisions I and II of the NCAA.

Tournament Appearances by Conference

CHA

ECAC

Hockey East

NEWHA

WCHA

Defunct teams

Teams without a tournament appearance

The following active Division I programs have never qualified for the NCAA tournament.

CHA: Lindenwood
ECAC Hockey: RPI, Union
Hockey East: Holy Cross, Maine, Merrimack, UConn, Vermont
NEWHA: Franklin Pierce, Post, Sacred Heart, Saint Anselm, Saint Michael's, Stonehill
WCHA: Bemidji State, Minnesota State, St. Cloud State
 St. Thomas will play its first National Collegiate season in 2021–22. The Tommies will not be eligible for the tournament until 2024–25. While St. Thomas' ongoing transition from Division I to Division III will take five years in all, it will be tournament-eligible after three, reflecting the standard three-year transition period for moves from D-III to Division II.

References

External links
  NCAA Division I women ice hockey page
 NCAA Ice Hockey, Division I Women's Records

 
College women's ice hockey in the United States